Uwe Hain (born 18 October 1955) is a German former professional footballer who played as a goalkeeper. His brother, Mathias Hain, is also a professional footballer, playing in the same position.

Honours
 Bundesliga: 1982–83
 European Cup: 1982–83
 DFB-Pokal: 1986–87

References

External links
 

1955 births
Living people
People from Wolfenbüttel (district)
Footballers from Lower Saxony
German footballers
Association football goalkeepers
Eintracht Braunschweig players
Eintracht Braunschweig managers
Eintracht Braunschweig non-playing staff
Hamburger SV players
VfL Wolfsburg players
Bundesliga players
2. Bundesliga players
German football managers